The word "transit" refers to cases where the nearer object appears smaller than the more distant object. Cases where the nearer object appears larger and completely hides the more distant object are known as occultations.

In astronomy, planetary transits and occultations occur when a planet passes in front of another object, as seen by an observer. The occulted object may be a distant star, but in rare cases it may be another planet, in which case the event is called a mutual planetary occultation or mutual planetary transit, depending on the relative apparent diameters of the objects.

Mutual planetary occultations and transits
Mutual occultations or transits of planets are extremely rare. The most recent event occurred on 3 January 1818, and the next will occur on 22 November 2065. Both involve the same two planets: Venus and Jupiter.

Historical observations
An occultation of Mars by Venus on 13 October 1590 was observed by the German astronomer Michael Maestlin at Heidelberg. The 1737 event (see list below) was observed by John Bevis at Greenwich Observatory – it is the only detailed account of a mutual planetary occultation. A transit of Mars across Jupiter on 12 September 1170 was observed by the monk Gervase at Canterbury, and by Chinese astronomers.

Future events
The next time a mutual planetary transit or occultation will happen (as seen from Earth) will be on 22 November 2065 at about 12:43 UTC, when Venus near superior conjunction (with an angular diameter of 10.6") will transit in front of Jupiter (with an angular diameter of 30.9"); however, this will take place only 8° west of the Sun, and will therefore not be visible to the unaided/unprotected eye. Before transiting Jupiter, Venus will occult Jupiter's moon Ganymede at around 11:24 UTC as seen from some southernmost parts of Earth. Parallax will cause actual observed times to vary by a few minutes, depending on the precise location of the observer.

List of mutual planetary occultations and transits
There are only 18 mutual planetary transits and occultations as seen from Earth between 1700 and 2200. There is a very long break of events between 1818 and 2065.
19 September 1702 – Jupiter occults Neptune (pre-discovery)
20 July 1705 – Mercury transits Jupiter
14 July 1708 – Mercury occults Uranus (pre-discovery)

4 October 1708 – Mercury transits Jupiter
28 May 1737 – Venus occults Mercury
29 August 1771 – Venus transits Saturn
21 July 1793 – Mercury occults Uranus
9 December 1808 – Mercury transits Saturn
3 January 1818 – Venus transits Jupiter
22 November 2065 – Venus transits Jupiter
15 July 2067 – Mercury occults Neptune
11 August 2079 – Mercury occults Mars
27 October 2088 – Mercury transits Jupiter
7 April 2094 – Mercury transits Jupiter
21 August 2104 – Venus occults Neptune
14 September 2123 – Venus transits Jupiter
29 July 2126 – Mercury occults Mars
3 December 2133 – Venus occults Mercury

Mutual occultations, transits, and eclipses of the moons of Jupiter and Saturn
Twice during the orbital cycles of Jupiter and Saturn, the equatorial (and satellite) planes of those planets are aligned with Earth's orbital plane, resulting in a series of mutual occultations and eclipses between the moons of these giant planets. The terms eclipse, occultation, and transit are also used to describe these events. A satellite of Jupiter (for example) may be eclipsed (i.e. made dimmer because it moves into Jupiter's shadow), occulted (i.e. hidden from view because Jupiter lies on our line of sight), or may transit (i.e. pass in front of) Jupiter's disk (see also Solar eclipses on Jupiter).

Other planetary occultations
This table is another compilation of occultations and transits of bright stars and planets by solar planets. These events are not visible everywhere the occulting body and the occulted body are above the skyline. Some events are barely visible, because they take place in close proximity to the Sun.

References

Astronomical events
Stellar occultation